Phaeocollybia amygdalospora is a species of fungus in the family Cortinariaceae. Found in Durango, Mexico, where it grows under pine, it was described as new to science in 1996 by mycologists Victor Bandala and Egon Horak. It has amygdaliform (almond-shaped) spores (for which it is named) that measure 6.5–9 by 4–5 µm.

References

External links

Cortinariaceae
Fungi described in 1996
Fungi of Mexico
Fungi without expected TNC conservation status